Chandan Arora is an Indian film editor and director in Bollywood, most known for his films, Main, Meri Patni Aur Woh (2005) and Striker (2010). He also won the Filmfare Award for Best Editing for Company in 2003.

Chandan Arora started as an assistant director in 1990, and later worked with director Ram Gopal Varma, as an editor in films like, Pyaar Tune Kya Kiya (2001), Road (2002), and Company (2003).

Eventually he made his directorial debut with, Main Madhuri Dixit Banna Chahti Hoon in 2003, produced by Ram Gopal Varma  and followed it up comedy, Main, Meri Patni Aur Woh (2005)

Filmography

Director
 Main Madhuri Dixit Banna Chahti Hoon (2003)
 Main, Meri Patni Aur Woh (2005)
 Striker (2010)

Editor
 Mast (1999)
 Jungle (2000)
 Raju Chacha (2000)
 Pyaar Tune Kya Kiya (2001)
 Filhaal... (2002)
 Road (2002)
 Kehtaa Hai Dil Baar Baar (2002)
 Company (2002)
 Cheeni Kum (2007)
 Karma, Confessions and Holi (2007)
 Krrish 3 (2013)
 Fandry (2013)
 Ghayal Once Again (2016)
 Ki & Ka (2016)
 Pad Man (2018)
 Mission Mangal (2019)
 Jawaani Jaaneman (2020)
 Chandigarh Kare Aashiqui (2021)
 Ved (2022)

Awards
 Filmfare Award
 2003: Best Editing: Company 
 IIFA Award
 2003: Best Editing: Company

References

External links
 

21st-century Indian film directors
Hindi-language film directors
Hindi film editors
Filmfare Awards winners
Living people
Year of birth missing (living people)